Ernest Armstrong (12 January 1915 – 8 July 1996) was a British Labour Party politician.

Armstrong was educated at Wolsingham Grammar School and City of Leeds Teacher Training College, and ultimately became a headmaster. He served as a councillor on Sunderland Borough Council and chaired its education committee.

Defeated  by the Conservative incumbent in Sunderland South in the 1955 and 1959 General Elections, Armstrong was Member of Parliament (MP) for North West Durham from 1964 until his retirement in 1987. His daughter, Hilary Armstrong, was his successor.

Armstrong served as a parliamentary private secretary (PPS) from 1965, and a Labour whip, and junior minister for Education and Science (1974–1975) and the Environment (1975–1979).

Armstrong was a Methodist local preacher and served as vice-president of the Methodist Conference in 1974.

After Labour lost the 1979 general election, he served as a Deputy Speaker.

After his retirement, Armstrong acted as political adviser to the BBC's production of the political drama House of Cards.

References 

 The Times Guide to the House of Commons, Times Newspapers Ltd, 1987
 Whitaker's Almanack 1997

External links 
 

1915 births
1996 deaths
Councillors in Tyne and Wear
Labour Party (UK) MPs for English constituencies
Members of the Privy Council of the United Kingdom
Methodist local preachers
Ministers in the Wilson governments, 1964–1970
UK MPs 1964–1966
UK MPs 1966–1970
UK MPs 1970–1974
UK MPs 1974
UK MPs 1974–1979
UK MPs 1979–1983
UK MPs 1983–1987